Shen Bao-ni (born 13 July 1954) is a Taiwanese former swimmer. She competed in six events at the 1968 Summer Olympics.

References

External links
 

1954 births
Living people
Taiwanese female backstroke swimmers
Taiwanese female freestyle swimmers
Taiwanese female medley swimmers
Olympic swimmers of Taiwan
Swimmers at the 1968 Summer Olympics
Swimmers from Zhejiang
Asian Games medalists in swimming
Asian Games bronze medalists for Chinese Taipei
Swimmers at the 1970 Asian Games
Medalists at the 1970 Asian Games
20th-century Taiwanese women